Indonesia Open can refer to several sporting events:

 Indonesia Open (golf), a golf tournament
 Indonesia Open (badminton), a badminton tournament
 Indonesia Open (tennis), a WTA tennis tournament held from 1993 to 1997